The Loehle Sport Parasol is an American single-seat, parasol winged, single engine, ultralight aircraft produced in kit form by Loehle Aircraft for amateur construction. The aircraft meets the requirements of the US FAR 103 Ultralight Vehicles regulations.

When the design was introduced to the market it garnered a high degree of attention for its very low kit price, although the initial price did not include the engine, propeller, instruments or covering supplies. It was still one of the lower cost kit aircraft in 2010. Loehle Aircraft is believed to have ceased operations in 2017.

Design and development
The Sport Parasol was introduced in 1991. The aircraft is conventional in construction, built predominantly from wood and riveted aluminum tubing, covered in doped aircraft fabric. The wings are double-surface, with half-span ailerons. The wings detach and the tailplane folds for trailer transport and storage. The landing gear is of conventional configuration, with bungee-sprung main gear and a steerable tailwheel.

The initial engine recommended for the design was the now out-of-production  Rotax 277. Recommended engines today include  Rotax 447 and the  Rotax 503. Kit options include brakes, an extra  fuel tank, spoked wheels, floats and skis. Construction time from the kit is reported as 350 hours.

Reviewer Andre Cliche describes the aircraft as "a very attractive and simple parasol design that flies perfectly."

Bayerl et al. said of the aircraft, "for very low-cost flying this is pretty much it... [the Sport Parasol] offers  plenty of fun for little money."

Specifications (Sport Parasol)

See also

References

External links
 Last archived copy of official Web site - 1 July 2017
 Photo of Sport Parasol

1990s United States ultralight aircraft
Sport
Single-engined tractor aircraft
Parasol-wing aircraft